Cuvierina columnella is a species of gastropod in the family Cuvierinidae.

References 

Pteropoda
Animals described in 1827